Melquiades Morales Flores (born 22 June 1942) is a Mexican lawyer and politician, affiliated with the Partido Revolucionario Institucional (PRI). Between  1999 and 2005 he served as governor of the state of Puebla.

Born in the small town of Esperanza, Puebla, Morales studied law at the Autonomous University of Puebla (BUAP), where he also later taught. He has held various positions within the PRI's party structure, including a time as leader of the party in both the city of Puebla, Puebla, and in the state. In 1984 he served as Puebla's Secretary of the Interior, and has represented Puebla in both the Chamber of Deputies and the Senate. In 1998 he requested a leave of absence from his senatorial seat in order to seek the Puebla governorship.

In 2006 Melquiades Morales went back to the political spotlight, running for the second time trying to get a seat in the Senate, representing the state of Puebla, headlining the Partido Revolucionario Institucional (PRI) / Alianza por México nomination alongside Mario Alberto Montero Serrano.

His son Fernando Morales Martínez is also a politician.

References

External links
 Biography

1942 births
Living people
Governors of Puebla
Members of the Chamber of Deputies (Mexico)
Members of the Senate of the Republic (Mexico)
Politicians from Puebla
Institutional Revolutionary Party politicians
21st-century Mexican politicians
20th-century Mexican politicians
Meritorious Autonomous University of Puebla alumni
Academic staff of the Meritorious Autonomous University of Puebla